Cannabis in Azerbaijan is illegal but is cultivated illicitly, and has a long history as a medical remedy in the nation.

History
Academic Farid Alakbarov has written on cannabis medicines found in medieval Azerbaijani texts, including treatments for uterine tumors, hemorrhoids, and hysteria.

Cultivation
Per a 2011 report, cannabis is cultivated, mostly in southern Azerbaijan, "to a modest extent".

References

Azerbaijan
Politics of Azerbaijan
Drugs in Azerbaijan
Society of Azerbaijan